Peter Puček (born 9 September 1995) is a professional Slovak footballer who currently plays for FK Terchová as a midfielder or forward.

Club career

MŠK Žilina
He made his professional Fortuna Liga debut for MŠK Žilina against AS Trenčín on 8 March 2016.

References

External links
 
 Futbalnet profile
 Fortuna Liga profile
 Eurofotbal profile

1995 births
Living people
Slovak footballers
Association football forwards
MŠK Žilina players